Segovia is a town in Kimble County, Texas off I-10. Only a few roads go through the town, one being FM 2169. The town was named for Segovia in Spain. It consists of a truck stop, hotel, general store, and a population of less than 25.  It has not had a post office since 1964.

References 

Towns in Texas
Kimble County, Texas